Bouchra Hraich (also spelled "Ahrich"; born 27 July 1972 in Salé) is a Moroccan actress and comedian.

Biography 
Hraich was born in Salé. After graduating from high school, she enrolled at the Institut supérieur d'art dramatique et d'animation culturelle (ISADAC) in Rabat, where she spent four years studying stage acting.

Partial filmography

Feature films 

 2004: Tarfaya
 2008: Ex-Chemkar
 2011: Larbi ou le destin d'un grand footballeur
 2015: La Isla de Perejil
 2018: Corsa

Short films 

 2003: Balcon Atlantico

External links 

 Bouchra Ahrich - IMDb

References 

Moroccan actresses
Moroccan comedians
1972 births
Living people